Armoured Vehicles Nigam Limited (AVANI) is an Indian state-owned defence company, headquartered in Avadi, Chennai, India established in 2021 as part of the restructuring and corporatisation of the Ordnance Factory Board into seven different Public Sector Undertakings. AVANI primarily manufactures Armoured fighting vehicles, Main battle tanks and their engines for the use of the Indian Armed Forces and foreign militaries.

Some notable products of AVANI include:

 Arjun Main battle tank built by Heavy Vehicle Factory Avadi
 T-90 built by Heavy Vehicle Factory Avadi
 T-72 built by Heavy Vehicle Factory Avadi
 BMP-2 Sarath (Chariot of Victory)– Indian license-produced variant of the BMP-2, built by Ordnance Factory Medak
 Stallion truck platform for various military and logistics vehicles

See also
Other PSUs formed from Ordnance Factory Board:-
Advanced Weapons and Equipment India Limited (AWE), Kanpur
Gliders India Limited (GIL), Kanpur
India Optel Limited (IOL), Dehradun
Munitions India Limited (MIL), Pune
Troop Comforts Limited (TCL), Kanpur
Yantra India Limited (YIL), Nagpur

References

Defence companies of India
Government-owned companies of India

Military trucks of India
Ashok Leyland Defence Systems trucks